John M. Reed (c. 1881 – April 18, 1934) was an American football, basketball, and baseball coach.  He served as the head football coach at Franklin & Marshall College in Lancaster, Pennsylvania.  He held that position for the 1915 season.  His coaching record at Franklin & Marshall was 6–2.  Reed also coached at St. Lawrence University in 1914 and at Rensselaer Polytechnic Institute from 1916 to 1919.  Reed coached the Niagara University men's basketball team from 1906 to 1908 as well as their football team.

Reed was born in Middletown, Connecticut.  He died at the age of 52, on April 18, 1934, in Worcester, Massachusetts.

Head coaching record

Football

References

Year of birth missing
1880s births
1934 deaths
American football fullbacks
Basketball coaches from Connecticut
Alfred Saxons football coaches
Clarkson Golden Knights football coaches
Franklin & Marshall Diplomats baseball coaches
Franklin & Marshall Diplomats football coaches
Holy Cross Crusaders football coaches
Holy Cross Crusaders football players
Holy Cross Crusaders men's basketball coaches
Niagara Purple Eagles football coaches
Niagara Purple Eagles men's basketball coaches
Sportspeople from Middletown, Connecticut
Players of American football from Connecticut
RPI Engineers football coaches
St. Lawrence Saints football coaches